The Pentamerus Range is a mountain range in far northwestern Greenland. Administratively this range is part of Avannaata municipality. The area of the range is uninhabited.

This mountain chain was named after the Pentamerus fossils dating back to the Lower Silurian that have been found in it.

Geography
The Pentamerus Range is an up to almost 1,000 m high mountain range in Daugaard-Jensen Land. It runs roughly from northeast to southwest.

See also
List of mountain ranges of Greenland
Peary Land Group

Bibliography
Greenland geology and selected mineral occurrences - GEUS

References

External links
Geological map of Greenland - 1 : 500 000 - Polygon Legend - GEUS

Mountain ranges of Greenland